Cadaver is an isometric action-adventure game by the Bitmap Brothers, originally released by Image Works in August 1990, for Atari ST, Amiga and MS-DOS. A Sega Mega Drive version was planned but never released. In the game the player controls Karadoc the dwarf.

Plot and levels 

In the original Cadaver, Karadoc, who is a gold-hungry dwarf and really just hopes to find a treasure, is on a mission to seek out and kill the necromancer Dianos, the sole remaining inhabitant of Castle Wulf.

The game consists of five levels representing different floors of Castle Wulf. Entering the castle via the sewers, Karadoc works his way up from the dungeons, through guard chambers, royal hall, the king's private chambers and finally the battlements with Dianos's sanctum.

Karadoc's main modus operandi is picking up, throwing, pulling, pushing and stacking objects. By piling up a number of boxes, bones or other items, it is possible to reach higher places. Karadoc can find and use a small number of weapons such as rocks and shuriken, but puzzles are the main driving force behind the gameplay.

The game is heavily scripted. The isometric objects can react to a variety of other objects; for instance, a poisoned key can be cleaned by dropping a vial of water on it, and potions can be enhanced by the potion booster spell. The game has a wide variety of puzzles requiring items to be found, brought and used in a variety of places. The solutions to these puzzles sometimes require leaps in logic and the game has plenty of secret areas, hidden spells etc. Many of the puzzles also have multiple solutions, and there is often no specific order in which the puzzles on a level must be solved.

Gameplay

Movement 
The game is played using a joystick, which can control the movement of Karadoc in 8 directions. The directions are not as one would expect in a game from today - instead, they are rotated. If the joystick is pushed up, Karadoc will run "north", which is right-up on the screen. To move Karadoc up on the screen (which is "north-west" in the game), it is necessary to push the joystick left-up. The fire button of the joystick is used to jump.

Interaction with objects 
When Karadoc touches an object, he can push it around, unless it is too heavy (a potion of strength allows pushing heavier objects). Touching an object also causes the context menu to be enabled. When the context menu is enabled, the fire button is used to select an action from the menu instead of jumping. The possible actions depend on the type of object, and are represented with icons. They include things like investigate, pull, pick up, drink, open, insert, give and some others. Items which are picked up land in Karadocs inventory, and get additional actions, like cast for spells. One item at a time also can be readied, usually a weapon, which makes the fire button throw or use the readied item instead of jumping.

Development
Cadaver was initially developed as a level building tool on the Atari ST for adventure games, named the Adventure Level Editor, which was used to create Cadaver's levels. Levels in ALE are initially created as a two-dimensional map, in which the designer may define the size of each room (within the range of 3 x 3 to 10 x 10 tiles) and show interconnections between each room. After a room is created, is it converted to 3D, and background details and objects are added manually.

Cadaver is programmed in ACL, a programming language developed by the Bitmap Brothers' Steve Kelly. Objects in Cadaver are assigned a number, and associated with that number is ACL code that indicate how the object is manipulated under different circumstances, i.e. indicating if an object can be opened or used as a container. Events such as locking and unlocking doors are also controlled by ACL.

Expansion pack
An expansion pack titled Cadaver: The Payoff was released in 1991. After defeating Dianos, Karadoc returns to the inn only to find his employers gone, and every living person within the city either dead or transformed into a monster. Seeking the cause behind this, the dwarf fights his way to the local temple, and finds the answers - and his money - deep down in the crypts.

Gameplay is similar. Cadaver: The Payoff has only four levels, but they are significantly larger than those of the first game, and the second level has a large number of monsters and scant possibilities to heal.

Demos 

There are three levels besides the nine from the two official releases:

 Gatehouse, an early preview demo of the game, released on Amiga Format Cover Disk #13.
 Temple.
 The Last Supper, a demo released on Zero Coverdisk #15 in issue 23. The story takes place in the "Zeigenhoff" building, and sometimes this demo is referred to by that name.

Reception 
The game was received very well at its release. The Atari version was awarded as "C+VG HIT" in Computer and Video Games magazine issue 107  in 1990. In the same year, the Amiga version received a "CU Screen Star" from CU Amiga Magazine
 and was an "Amiga Joker Hit" in Amiga Joker magazine, amongst others.

The One gave the Amiga version of Cadaver: The Pay-Off an overall score of 88%, calling it a "worthwhile" expansion and expressing that it has "improvements in almost every department" over the original Cadaver. The One praises The Pay-Off's new content and similar difficulty, stating that "Players who have completed Cadaver will enjoy the greater variety and continued challenge".

According to the official site, it has received the following awards:
 Golden Chalice 1990 Adventure Game of the Year
 Generation 4 1990 Best Foreign Adventure
 Golden Chalice Adventure Game of the Year

References

External links 
 
 
 
 
 

1990 video games
Action-adventure games
Amiga games
Atari ST games
Cancelled Sega Genesis games
DOS games
Single-player video games
Video games scored by Richard Joseph
Video games developed in the United Kingdom
Video games set in castles
Video games with expansion packs
Video games with isometric graphics
The Bitmap Brothers games
Image Works games